Malcolm Wilmot (1771 – September 7, 1859) was a merchant and political figure in New Brunswick. He represented Westmorland in the Legislative Assembly of New Brunswick from 1823 to 1827.

He was born in Rhode Island, the son of a captain in the British army who served during the American revolution. Wilmot was a lieutenant in the King's New Brunswick Regiment, retiring on half pay when the regiment was disbanded in 1802. He was a general merchant and operated a shipping business at the Bend of Petitcodiac (later Moncton). He married a daughter of John Bentley. He was elected to the assembly in an 1823 by-election held after the election of Joseph Crandall was overturned because he was a preacher. Wilmot died at the Bend of Petitcodiac at the age of 88.

References 
 

1771 births
1859 deaths
Members of the Legislative Assembly of New Brunswick
Colony of New Brunswick people
United Empire Loyalists
British emigrants to pre-Confederation New Brunswick